The Contemporary Austin – Jones Center on Congress Avenue, formerly known as the AMOA-Arthouse at The Jones Center, is one of two museum sites of The Contemporary Austin.

History
Founded as the Texas Fine Arts Association (TFAA) in 1911, the organization's initial purpose was to maintain the studio and collection of sculptor Elisabet Ney, now the Elisabet Ney Museum. The Association's early leadership helped to establish the studio art department at The University of Texas at Austin, promote the formation of a state arts commission, and found some of the state's major art museums.

In 1927 TFAA began a visual arts touring program that brought selected works of art to communities throughout the state. In 1943, Clara Driscoll deeded her Austin estate, Laguna Gloria, to TFAA who operated the facility as an art museum until 1961 when the Laguna Gloria Art Museum, Inc. assumed that responsibility. Until the fall of 1998, TFAA maintained its state headquarters in the carriage house on the property, and annually held three exhibitions in the main building.

In 1995 TFAA's Board of Directors purchased the property at 700 Congress Avenue in Austin, TX. Three years after the building's purchase, TFAA opened its new headquarters, the Jones Center for Contemporary Art, in November 1998.

In November 2002, the name of the organization was officially changed from the Texas Fine Arts Association to Arthouse.

In 2010 Lewis.Tsurumaki.Lewis (LTL) architects completed radical expansions and renovations to Arthouse at the Jones Center. As part of the remodeling, LTL and award-winning New York City-based lighting design firm LumenArch installed 177 LED-lit rectangular laminated glass blocks perforating the southern and eastern walls of the building to create a “glowing” effect.

See also
 List of museums in Central Texas

Notes and references

External links

 The Contemporary Austin Website

Arts centers in Texas
Contemporary art galleries in the United States
Culture of Austin, Texas
1911 establishments in Texas
Art museums established in 1911
Tourist attractions in Austin, Texas
Buildings and structures in Austin, Texas